Arnold Schönhage (born 1 December 1934 in Lockhausen, now Bad Salzuflen) is a German mathematician and computer scientist.

Schönhage was professor at the Rheinische Friedrich-Wilhelms-Universität, Bonn, and also in Tübingen and Konstanz. He now lives near Bonn.

Together with Volker Strassen he developed the Schönhage–Strassen algorithm for fast integer multiplication that has a run-time of O(N log N log log N).

Schönhage designed and implemented together with Andreas F. W. Grotefeld and Ekkehart Vetter a multitape Turing machine, called TP, in software. The machine is programmed in TPAL, an assembler language. They implemented numerous numerical algorithms including the Schönhage–Strassen algorithm on this machine.

External links
 Homepage with list of publications
 Schönhage's TP page with short introduction, samples and download link

1934 births
Living people
People from Bad Salzuflen
German computer scientists
Approximation theorists
People from the Free State of Lippe
20th-century German mathematicians
21st-century German mathematicians
Academic staff of the University of Bonn
Academic staff of the University of Tübingen
Academic staff of the University of Konstanz
University of Cologne alumni